Phoxinus likai is a species of freshwater fish in the family Cyprinidae. It is found in the River Oruca system in Croatia.

References

Phoxinus
Taxa named by Pier Giorgio Bianco
Taxa named by Salvatore De Bonis
Fish described in 2015